Alberto Bettiol (born 29 October 1993) is an Italian professional road racing cyclist, who currently rides for UCI WorldTeam . Bettiol turned professional in 2014, with his first professional win coming at the 2019 Tour of Flanders. He competed at the 2020 Summer Olympics, in Road race, and Time trial.

Biography
Born on 29 October 1993, in Poggibonsi, Tuscany, Bettiol resides in Castelfiorentino, Tuscany, Italy.

He was named in the start list for the 2016 Giro d'Italia. In June 2017, he was named in the startlist for the 2017 Tour de France.

2019 
After spending the 2018 season in BMC Racing Team, he returned to his previous team (now called EF Education First Pro Cycling).

After a strong performance at the Tirreno–Adriatico, most notably finishing 3rd on the second stage and 2nd on the final stage (an individual time trial), he won his first professional race at the Tour of Flanders, one of cycling's five monuments. Following a successful solo attack on the second to last climb of the race, Oude Kwaremont, he managed to keep the gap to the chasing group which included several of the pre-race favorites, including previous winners Alexander Kristoff and Peter Sagan, for the remaining 17 km.

Major results

2011
 1st  Time trial, UEC European Junior Road Championships
 1st  Overall Giro della Lunigiana
1st  Points classification
1st Stages 1 & 3
2013
 National Under-23 Road Championships
3rd Road race
5th Time trial
 3rd Trofeo Franco Balestra
 3rd Gran Premio della Liberazione
 4th Overall Coupe des nations Ville Saguenay
 7th Road race, UEC European Under-23 Road Championships
 10th Ronde Van Vlaanderen Beloften
2015
 10th Gran Piemonte
2016
 2nd Bretagne Classic
 3rd Overall Tour de Pologne
1st  Points classification
 4th Grand Prix Cycliste de Québec
 7th Grand Prix Cycliste de Montréal
 10th Gran Piemonte
2017
 4th Coppa Ugo Agostoni
 5th Gran Premio Bruno Beghelli
 6th Clásica de San Sebastián
 10th E3 Harelbeke
2018
 1st Stage 1 (TTT) Tirreno–Adriatico
2019
 1st Tour of Flanders
 National Road Championships
2nd Time trial
3rd Road race
 4th E3 Binckbank Classic
 6th Brabantse Pijl
2020
 2nd Overall Étoile de Bessèges
1st Stage 5 (ITT)
 4th Strade Bianche
 4th Gent–Wevelgem
2021
 1st Stage 18 Giro d'Italia
2022
 2nd Overall Étoile de Bessèges
 5th Gran Piemonte
 8th Road race, UCI Road World Championships
 8th Grand Prix Cycliste de Québec
 10th Grand Prix La Marseillaise
  Combativity award Stage 10 Tour de France
2023
 1st Prologue Tour Down Under

Classics results timeline

Grand Tour general classification results timeline

References

External links

Cycling Base: Alberto Bettiol
Cycling Quotient: Alberto Bettiol

Cannondale-Garmin: Alberto Bettiol 

1993 births
Living people
People from Poggibonsi
Sportspeople from the Province of Siena
Italian male cyclists
Italian Giro d'Italia stage winners
Olympic cyclists of Italy
Cyclists at the 2020 Summer Olympics
Cyclists from Tuscany